John Greening (born 20 March 1954 in Chiswick, London) is an English poet, critic, playwright and teacher. He has published over twenty poetry collections large and small, including To the War Poets (2013) and The Silence (2019), both from Carcanet Press. He has edited a major illustrated edition of Edmund Blunden’s war memoir, Undertones of War, for Oxford University Press and produced editions of poetry by Geoffrey Grigson and Iain Crichton Smith. His anthologies include Accompanied Voices: Poets on Composers from Thomas Tallis to Arvo Pärt and Hollow Palaces (selected modern country house poems co-edited with Kevin Gardner for Liverpool University Press, 2021). He has reviewed poetry for the Times Literary Supplement since the 1990s. His collected reviews and essays, Vapour Trails (Shoestring Press), appeared late in 2020. He is a recipient of the Alexandria International Poetry Prize (1981), the Bridport Prize (1998), the TLS Centenary Prize (2001) and a Cholmondeley Award (2008).

Background
John Greening was born in Chiswick and brought up in Kew and Hounslow. He attended Wellington Primary School and Isleworth Grammar School. Greening studied English Literature  at Swansea University. He won a studentship to the University of Mannheim in Germany and then spent a year at the University of Exeter, where he wrote a dissertation on verse drama for his M.A. He married Jane Woodland in 1978.

He has written a series of plays, one of which, about Robert Louis Stevenson, was awarded Best New Play at the Edinburgh Festival. Another, about the Lindbergh kidnapping, was premiered in Asheville, North Carolina in 2002. Others he has staged with young people while teaching at Kimbolton School, and he took a one-man play about Gordon of Khartoum to the Edinburgh Fringe in 1984.  He corresponded about his early verse plays with Ronald Duncan and with Ted Hughes. His first play was staged in Exeter – about Robert Schumann. 

Greening has taught for much of his life, including two years with Voluntary Service Overseas (VSO) in Aswan, Upper Egypt. Shortly before leaving in 1981, he was awarded the Alexandria International Poetry Prize and received the medal and papyrus certificate from Jehan Sadat on the site of the ancient Pharos. In 1983, after some time teaching Vietnamese boat people in northeastern Scotland, he and Jane moved to Kimbolton, Cambridgeshire (originally Huntingdonshire) where they have lived ever since – apart from a year on a Fulbright exchange in New Jersey 1990-91 – and where their two daughters were born. Greening taught for many years at Kimbolton School and established a poetry reading series at Kimbolton Castle. He has tutored all ages for the Indian King Arts Centre in Camelford, Cornwall, for the Arvon Foundation and currently for the Poetry School in Cambridge, where he was until recently RLF Writing Fellow at Newnham College.

Poetry Publications
Greening’s first poems were published in Emma Tennant’s Bananas, and his earliest Egyptian-themed poems appeared in Poetry Review. In the early 1980s, he received a Scottish Arts Council Award while living in Arbroath. His first collection was published in 1982. He has published over twenty collections, most recently the pamphlets Achill Island Tagebuch, Europa’s Flight, Moments Musicaux (Poetry Salzburg, 2020) and the two full Carcanet Press collections, To the War Poets (2013) and The Silence (2019), the latter featuring his long poem about Jean Sibelius. Earlier books include his 1991 Bloodaxe collection, The Tutankhamun Variations, the more pastoral sequences of Fotheringhay and Other Poems, The Coastal Path and The Bocase Stone, then in 1998 a first "Selected" – Nightflights – and two long poems: Gascoigne’s Egg (Cargo Press, 2000) and Omm Sety, both of which showed a growing interest in the occult. The substantial collection The Home Key appeared in 2003, followed in 2008 by Iceland Spar (the result of a pilgrimage to Akureyri, sponsored by the Society of Authors). These were followed by a more substantial "Selected" – Hunts: Poems 1979-2009 – and the chapbook Knot In 2016, there was a Heathrow collaboration with Penelope Shuttle, Heath A further collaboration, consisting of thirty-five years’ holiday sonnets exchanged with Stuart Henson, a Postcard to, appeared in December 2020, while his pamphlet The Giddings appeared in March 2021. The Interpretation of Owls: Selected Poems is forthcoming from Baylor University Press.

Other Writings
Other books include a memoir, in prose and verse, of life in Egypt, Threading a Dream: A Poet on the Nile, as well as guides to poetry (Poetry Masterclass) and to poets (Elizabethan Love Poets, W. B. Yeats, Thomas Hardy, Edward Thomas, the First World War Poets, and Ted Hughes). Greening has been a reviewer for journals such as Poetry Review, London Magazine, Hudson Review and the Times Literary Supplement. His collected reviews and essays, Vapour Trails, was released in 2020. His editorial projects include an expanded, illustrated edition of Edmund Blunden's WW1 memoir Undertones of War as well as editions of the poetry of Iain Crichton Smith (Deer on the High Hills, forthcoming 2021 from Carcanet) and Geoffrey Grigson (Selected Poems, Greenwich Exchange, 2017).  His anthologies include Accompanied Voices: Poets on Composers from Thomas Tallis to Arvo Pärt (Boydell & Brewer, 2015), Ten Poems about Sheds (Candlestick, 2018), and the forthcoming Hollow Palaces (a selection of modern country-house poems, with Kevin Gardner, Liverpool University Press, 2021). He has collaborated with composers Roderick Williams, Cecilia McDowall, Ben Parry (musician), David Gibbs, and Philip Lancaster.

Criticism and Reviews
Of Hunts: Poems 1979-2009, Glyn Pursglove writes in the poetry magazine Acumen, "Since the end of the 1970s, John Greening has steadily established himself a significant presence in contemporary English poetry... Beyond the admirable craftsmanship that characterises almost all of his work, one of Greening’s great strengths is his historical imagination... Greening’s major sequences are splendid examples of the poetry of place, extended reflections upon the individual’s place in his community, upon place as the creator (and creation) of individuals, full of specifics, but never merely parochial... There is much here to enjoy and admire in the work of a serious (but never excessively solemn) poet, who cares about both ‘facts’ and ideas and makes his poetry out of the interpenetration of the two."

On To the War Poets, Denis Joe writes in Manchester Salon, "Too many poets, since [the world wars], seem intent on trying to capture an idea of ‘what it was like’.... So it is refreshing to come across this volume of poems from John Greening. None of the poems in this volume make any pretence in attempting to capture some sort of feeling of the war, as one critic put it: 'These are not poems as history lessons.' There is no faux rage about the slaughter of so many men, instead Greening takes us on a journey through the century still recovering from the upheaval of that war.... Greening realises that there is no need for dramatics to put across the feel of war; in this sense he displays a great deal of respect for his audience: allowing them to respond to his poetry in their own way and at their own time. In doing so he captures the humanity of the war poets, who, in their own way, also rejected hysteria in regards to their own work, and in many ways gave a feeling of ordinariness to their experience of the war.... [To the War Poets] is a volume of contemporary poetry in the truest sense that I hope will be read in many years to come, alongside the works of the War Poets."

On The Silence, David Malcolm writes in Poetry Salzburg Review, "John Greening’s The Silence is a fine collection of verse – coherent and yet varied, constantly fresh and insightful, often deeply moving, deploying a language that is as vibrant as its vision of the world. It is a collection to return to frequently, in order to immerse oneself in its richness, its darkness, and its felicity of voice." Frank Beck writes in Manhattan Review, "It’s a loving and inventive meditation on the sources of creative inspiration; the vagaries of artistic confidence; and the ability of the mind to keep observing, associating and struggling to build connections, even when those connections unravel, again and again." Kevin Gardner writes in PN Review of the long poem about Sibelius, "The Silence is a compelling exploration of the pressure of fame and the burden of creativity.  It is, moreover, an affecting and exquisite poem.  The structure sets order at odds with chaos: formal quatrains work in counterpoint against lines of variable syllabic count, while a steady slant-rhyme scheme is disrupted by an adroit use of enjambment."

Of Achill Island Tagebuch, Martyn Crucefix writes, "Greening’s long-established deftness with poetic form is on full display here but it is the (seeming) ease of encompassing that is so impressive. The hedgerows of 'trickling fuchsia' and the 'decayed tooth' of Slievemore are conjoined with be-helmeted cycling jaunts, ill-informed tourists and European research students, while the writer frets about whether the Muses are going to turn up or the disturbing nature of his own dreams – all this alongside more newsworthy items like forest fires on the Greek mainland, Brexit (of course), the discovery of water on Mars and the release of the new Mission Impossible film."

Honors and awards
Greening received the Alexandria International Poetry Prize in 1981 and the Scottish Arts Council Award. Greening was one of the top six of the Observer Poetry Prize in 1987. He has won the Bridport Prize and the TLS Centenary Prize, and he received a Cholmondeley Award from the Society of Authors. He is the recipient of two Hawthornden Castle fellowships and a Fulbright teaching fellowship. Greening has been one of the judges for the Eric Gregory Award. His poem "Sibelius" was chosen by Carol Rumens as her "Poem of the week" in The Guardian, 4 January 2021.

Bibliography

Poetry collections
1982 Westerners (Hippopotamus Press)
1984 Winter Journeys (Rivelin Press)
1991 The Tutankhamun Variations (Bloodaxe Books)
1995 Fotheringhay and Other Poems (Rockingham Press)
1996 The Coastal Path (Headland Books)
1996 The Bocase Stone (Dedalus Press, Ireland)
1998 Nightflights, New & Selected Poems (Rockingham Press)
2000 Gascoigne’s Egg (Cargo Press), 2000
2001 Omm Sety (Shoestring Press)
2003 The Home Key (Shoestring Press)
2008 Iceland Spar (Shoestring Press)
2009 Hunts: Poems 1979-2009 (Greenwich Exchange)
2013 Knot (Worple Press)
2013 To the War Poets (Carcanet Press/Oxford Poets)
2016 Nebamun’s Tomb (Rack Press)
2016 Heath (with Penelope Shuttle, Nine Arches Press)
2019 Achill Island Tagebuch (Redfoxpress)
2019 The Silence (Carcanet Press)
2019 Europa’s Flight (New Walk Editions)
2020 Moments Musicaux (Poetry Salzburg)
2020 a Postcard to (with Stuart Henson, Red Squirrel Press)
2021 The Giddings (Mica Press)
2022 Omniscience (Broken Sleep Books)
2022 Nightwalker's Song (Arc Poetry) - translations of Johann Wolfgang von Goethe
2023 The Interpretation of Owls: Selected Poems (Baylor University Press)

Prose
2004 Poets of the First World War (Greenwich Exchange)
2005 W.B.Yeats (Greenwich Exchange)
2007 Thomas Hardy: The Emma Poems (Greenwich Exchange)
2007 The Poetry of Ted Hughes (Greenwich Exchange)
2008 Edward Thomas (Greenwich Exchange)
2010 Elizabethan Love Poets (Greenwich Exchange)
2011 Poetry Masterclass (Greenwich Exchange)
2017 Threading a Dream: A Poet on the Nile (Gatehouse Press)
2020 Vapour Trails: Reviews and Essays (Shoestring Press)

As editor
2015 Accompanied Voices: Poets on Composers (Boydell & Brewer)
2015 Edmund Blunden’s Undertones of War (Oxford University Press)
2017 Geoffrey Grigson: Selected Poems (Greenwich Exchange)
2018 Ten Poems about Sheds (Candlestick Press)
2021 Iain Crichton Smith: Deer on the High Hills (Carcanet Press)
2021 Hollow Palaces (with Kevin Gardner, Liverpool University Press)

Plays
1976 Schumann (premiered at University of Exeter in 1977)
1979 Domna (stage play about Septimius Severus, performed at Kimbolton School, 1985)
1980 High Dam (stage play about Nubians)
1981 The Isis Myth (stage play about ex-colonials given rehearsed reading at Riverside Studios, Hammersmith) 
1982 The Stevenson Play (stage play awarded Best New Play (Ind Coop Award) at the Edinburgh Festival) 
1984 Gordon (one-man stage play later adapted for radio as Between the Two Niles, performed by Stephen Hanvey at the 1984 Edinburgh Fringe) 
1986 The Maskes of Oliver Cromwell (stage play, first performed at Kimbolton School)
1991 A Ladder in Hopewell (stage play premiered in 2002 in Asheville, North Carolina by Jericho Productions directed by Franklin Harris) 
1992 Philemon and Baucis in the Fens (radio verse play)
1993 Voyage of the Argo (stage play first performed at Kimbolton School)
2000 Minotaur (radio verse play)
2002 Ether (stage play about Sir Oliver Lodge and spiritualism)

References

External Links 
Entry on John Greening in The Literary Encyclopedia
Entry on John Greening in Encyclopedia.com
John Greening's website
Greening's website, archived at the Bodleian Library, Oxford
Interview with John Greening by Sophie Wilshaw, I Don't Call Myself a Poet,  8 August 2012
Fire River Poets interview with John Greening by Graeme Ryan, 11 January 2021

1954 births
Living people